Ujjani Dam, also known as Bhima Dam or Bhima Irrigation Project, on the Bhima River, a tributary of the Krishna River, is an earthfill cum Masonry gravity dam located near Ujjani village of Madha Taluk in Solapur district of the state of Maharashtra in India.

The construction of the dam project including the canal system on both banks was started in 1969 at an initial estimated cost of Rs 400 million and when completed in June 1980 the cost incurred was of the order of Rs 3295.85 million.

The project provides multipurpose benefits of irrigation, hydroelectric power, drinking, and industrial water supply and fisheries development. The irrigation supplies benefit  of agricultural land, particularly in the Solapur district. Water supplied from the reservoir to irrigate agricultural areas primarily aims to reduce the incidence of famines and scarcity during drought conditions. The reservoir operation also lessens the threat due to floods to cities such as Pandharpur (an important religious pilgrimage centre for the Hindus). As a result of irrigation facilities, some of the important crops grown under irrigated conditions are sugarcane, wheat, millet and cotton.

Geography

The Bhima River on which the Ujjani Dam has been built rises from Bhimashankar hills in the Western Ghats, also known as the Sahyadri hill range. The river flows for a length of  till it meets the Krishna River (one of the two major river systems in Maharashtra, the other being the Godavari River) near Raichur in Raichur district in Karnataka. Bhima River Basin has many tributaries of which the major ones are the Kundali River, Kumandala River, Ghod river, Bhama River, Indrayani River, Mula River, Mutha River, Pavna River, Bori, Sina, Man, Bhogwati and Nira. The Upper Bhima River basin is subdivided into three zones namely northern, middle and southern, the main stem of the river is in the middle zone where the Bhima Dam is built, while the southern zone is dominated by five reservoirs. The basin above the dam has intense rural, agricultural, urban and industrial activities. The river basin, which has a slope from west to east has extreme physiographic and agro-climatic variations. The drainage basin has rich and fertile agricultural land, and several water resources development projects have been built on its river system. Government of Maharashtra has classified the stretches of the Upper Bhima River for the purpose of various uses as, A-I for drinking water without conventional treatment but after disinfection, A-II Drinking water after conventional treatment followed by disinfection, A-III for fish and wildlife propagation and A-IV for agriculture, industrial cooling and process.

Climate

The basin experiences tropical monsoon climatic conditions.

Hydrology
Since the Bhima River which is a major tributary of the Krishna River is an interstate river, the flows are shared by the Upper riparian state of Maharashtra with the lower riparian Karnataka state. The Krishna Water Disputes Tribunal, in its award in the year 1976 permitted Maharashtra to use only  from the Upper Bhima River Basin.

Features

The Ujjani Dam commissioned in June 1980 is an earth cum concrete masonry dam, which has created a multipurpose reservoir. The spillway is flanked by Non Overflow (NOF) concrete gravity dams of  length. Earth dam sections flank the NOF dams on the left and right banks. The energy dissipation arrangements on the downstream slope of the spillway is in the form of high level and low level slotted roller bucket type. Measuring instruments have been installed in the body of the dam to record and analyse various parameters related to the behaviour of the dam over the years as part of the dam safety programme The dam is founded on massive basaltic rock formations.

Reservoir

The rim of the reservoir periphery measures .

Two years after the commissioning of the project, the reservoir water quality was tested to establish its suitability for various uses. The physical and chemical analysis indicated that the pH values, free carbon dioxide, total hardness, alkalinity, nitrates, nitrites, chlorides, sulphates, calcium and magnesium were within prescribed limits. Heavy metals, copper and lead were not present. However, during the rainy season, the iron content though high, was found to be within permissible limits. Potassium and ammonia were within prescribed safe limits of acceptance for use of stored water for drinking, industrial use and for fish propagation. However, since its creation in 1980, it is now recorded that substantial quantity of the untreated sewage is discharged into the streams which flow into the Ujjani Reservoir, particularly in the river stretch close to the Pune city.

The reservoir created by the Ujjani dam is also one of the largest backwaters in India,  Since its creation in 1980, the reservoir backwaters attract, every year, a large number of migratory birds (from North India and other countries); about 100–150 species of flamingos and cormorants are reported. The migratory bird species in the Ujjani reservoir have been studied by the Science and Technology Park (STP), a Pune-based institution. Some of the key species which are found around backwaters are: greater flamingos, pheasant-tailed jacana, painted stork, moorhen, small pratincole, river terns, aquatic insects, pied kingfisher and stilts.

Benefits
The Ujjani Dam and its large reservoir provide multi-purpose benefits of irrigation, hydroelectric power generation, drinking and industrial water supply, and fisheries.

Irrigation

Bhima to Sina interlink  (Jod Kalava) with 21 km long tunnel from Ujjani reservoir is constructed to supply water for vast lands in catchment area of Sina tributary.

Farmers management organizations set up in the command area of the project are an important component of equitable distribution of irrigation under the rotational irrigation water management practice followed in the command. The irrigation component of the Ujjani Dam project was co-financed by IFAD and the World Bank with specific objective to enhance the social and economic conditions of the Scheduled castes and Scheduled tribe people in the command.

Hydropower

The lower pond in the pumped storage scheme of operation was built initially itself, soon after commissioning of the dam. The power plant is reported to be providing benefits since then. However, the power generation estimated initially at 105 GWh was expected to reduce to 21 GWh, as water was utilized for irrigation through the RBC and LBC canal systems.

During the drought year 2015, the inflows into the reservoir were very meagre due to the failure of rains in the catchment area. However, nearly 36 tmcft dead storage water available in the reservoir could not be used for the dire needs. With minor external modifications to the exiting reversible hydro turbine unit, all the dead storage water can be put to use during the drought years by using the hydro power plant for pumping water into the nearby left canal. Water would be released downstream into the tail pond through the existing river sluice gates. The pen stock of the hydro power unit is extended (less than 100 m long) to connect to the nearby left canal. The hydro power unit is operated in pumping mode to pump water from the tail pond to the left canal when the reservoir level is below the canal's minimum draw down level (MDDL). The pen stock extension piping is detached when water pumping to the canal is not required to restore its normal power generation when the reservoir level is above the left canal's MDDL

Other benefits
The high density of phytoplankton (of many species) in the Ujjani Reservoir is conducive to proliferation of fish species. Production of fish resources from the reservoir has been estimated at 712 tonnes per year, and 19 percent of the catch consists species of major carps. Fish yield is reported to be 2450 kg/km2 of the water spread area of the reservoir.

Bird watching
With the water reservoir of Ujani Dam, Bhigwan is a small town developed on the Pune-Solapur Highway around 105 km from Pune which is on the backwaters of Ujani dam. Bhigwan is famous for birdwatching especially flamingos and wild life photography. It is also known as mini Bharatpur. Many kinds of Ducks, Herons, Egrets, Raptors and Waders along with flocks of hundreds of flamingos can be seen. Variety of birds at Bhigwan gives of sighting of almost all the prime bird species there and also creates great photographic opportunities for wildlife photographers. At times,  1,000-1,200 flamingos are seen. The low rains and low water level has now reduced the number of flamingos over some years. It is a favorite spot for migratory birds, with more than 230 species found here. One can see flamingos, painted storks, bar-headed geese, demoiselle cranes, etc. These birds can be seen in the winter season between December and March. The bird generally migrates via marine routes and adult females depart from the breeding grounds .

See also

 List of dams and reservoirs in Maharashtra
 List of dams and reservoirs in India
 Krishna Water Disputes Tribunal

References

Dams completed in 1980
Energy infrastructure completed in 1980
Dams in Pune district
Hydroelectric power stations in Maharashtra
Pumped-storage hydroelectric power stations in India
Dams on the Krishna River
Masonry dams
1980 establishments in Maharashtra
20th-century architecture in India